Philip Williams (born 7 February 1963) is a footballer who played as a midfielder in the Football League for Crewe Alexandra, Wigan Athletic and Chester City.

References

Chester City F.C. players
1963 births
Living people
Footballers from Swansea
English Football League players
Crewe Alexandra F.C. players
Wigan Athletic F.C. players
Welsh footballers
Association football midfielders
Blackpool F.C. players
Oswestry Town F.C. players